The V535 is a model of cell phone from Motorola. It has limited
Bluetooth capabilities and a 0.3 megapixel digital camera with 4X digital zoom and video capabilities. 
Branded versions were released for Vodafone, T-Mobile and Orange called the V550, E550 and V545 respectively.

See also 
 Motorola
 Cell Phones

References

 Connecting a linux system to a Motorola V550 from LinuxPimp
 Review with user comments from mobile-phones-uk.org.uk

 A New Cell Phone

V550